Limonada is the fourth studio album by singer-songwriter Kany García. The album was released on November 19, 2016. It debuted at number one on the United States Billboard Top Latin Albums chart, selling over 2,000 copies in its first week. The album subsequently became García's first number one album.
The album remained at the top of the charts for 2 straight weeks.

Album Information
Garcia talks about the album, "Limonada is the most refreshing beverage and this is the most refreshing album that I have made. The album is about having a positive outlook in life, and how you can fight your battles making the best lemonade with the lemons life gives you in this journey.”

Track listing

Singles
Info:

"Perfecto Para Mi"

"Como Decirle"

"Aqui" feat. Abel Pintos

"Me Pregunto"
Did not chart.

Charts

Tour 
Garcia played a 5 date tour to support the album between January 2017 and July 2017. She played one date in each venue; San Juan, Puerto Rico, Guatemala City, Guatemala, San José, Costa Rica, Orlando, USA, Santo Domingo, Dominican Republic.

References

2016 albums
Kany García albums
Sony Music Latin albums